Le Puy – Loudes Airport  is an airport located in Loudes and 10 km west-northwest of Le Puy-en-Velay, both communes of the Haute-Loire département in the Auvergne région of France.

Airlines and destinations 
The following airlines operate regular scheduled and charter flights at Le Puy – Loudes Airport:

Statistics

References

External links 
 Aéroport Le Puy-en-Velay - Loudes 
 
 

Airports in Auvergne-Rhône-Alpes